Wang Tao may refer to:

 Wang Tao (19th century) (1828–1897), Chinese translator and publisher in Qing Dynasty
 Wang Tao (archaeologist) (born 1962), Chinese-British archaeologist
 Wang Tao (table tennis) (born 1967), Chinese table tennis player and coach
 Wang Tao (footballer, born 1967), Chinese footballer, player for Beijing Guoan and national team 
 Wang Tao (footballer, born 1970), Chinese footballer and chairman of Beijing Baxy
 Wang Tao (footballer, born 1987), Chinese footballer
 Wang Tao (handballer) (born 1957), Chinese handball player
 Wang Tao (sport shooter) (born 1982), Chinese sports shooter
 Tao Wang (economist), Chinese economist
 Frank Wang or Wang Tao, Chinese entrepreneur, founder of DJI
 Taoray Wang or Wang Tao, fashion designer
 Wang Tao, see List of fictional people of the Three Kingdoms#Chapter 109

See also
 Wang Dao (Wang Tao in Wade–Giles), a key official of the early Eastern Jin dynasty